Ben-Hur Moreira Peres (born 12 May 1977), simply known as Ben-Hur, is a Brazilian football coach and former player who played as either a central defender or a defensive midfielder. He is the current assistant manager of Guarani.

Honours
ABC
Campeonato Potiguar: 2007, 2008

Campinense
Campeonato Paraibano: 2012

External links

Futebol de Goyaz profile 

1977 births
Living people
People from Bagé
Brazilian footballers
Association football central defenders
Association football midfielders
Campeonato Brasileiro Série B players
Brasiliense Futebol Clube players
Ituano FC players
União São João Esporte Clube players
Treze Futebol Clube players
Canoas Sport Club players
Clube de Regatas Brasil players
Associação Atlética Coruripe players
ABC Futebol Clube players
Esporte Clube Novo Hamburgo players
Associação Atlética Anapolina players
Vila Nova Futebol Clube players
Campinense Clube players
Clube Recreativo e Atlético Catalano players
Goiânia Esporte Clube players
Brazilian football managers
Campeonato Brasileiro Série B managers
Guarani FC managers
Sportspeople from Rio Grande do Sul